Twitch Rivals is an esports tournament and online competitive event featuring Twitch streamers and former pro players.

History

Twitch Rivals 2018 
The first ever Twitch Rivals event was hosted on February 28, 2018. It included 38 events and 800 Twitch affiliates and partners.

Twitch Rivals 2019 
Twitchcon 2019 hosted a LAN based Twitch Rivals tournament for professional players, streamers, and attendees alike. Several notable celebrities participated in the tournament, including Grayson Allen, Tfue, and Dr DisRespect. In a podcast interview, CapitalistAries (a player who participated at the event) confirmed that the event "featured a wide variety of players, with about a third of the entire convention being involved." The tournament featured Fortnite on Friday, League of Legends (both standard gameplay, and Teamfight Tactics), and Apex Legends. While Twitch Rivals featured a two million dollar prize pool overall, Epic Games (who own Fortnite) supplied a million dollars to pay for the Fortnite tournament.

Fortnite 
The Fortnite Battle Royale tournament included a Top Creator Trios competition, which included many trios, including the following:

 Tfue, flyr, parpy
 72hrs, cloakzy, TimTheTatman
 Nickmercs, SypherPK, Nate Hill
 symfuhny, bugha, NickEh30
 aydan, DrLupo, seanpcc
 Chap, Vivid, Carose
 kinstaar, hunter, twiks
 gotaga, hhawkers, keolys
 Ceice, Elevate, CouRageJD
 MrSavage, KingRichard, rojo11
 mckyTV, Noward, Benjyfishy
 Myth, Kayuun, collinfrags

The format of this competition featured four four-match-long rounds, with only qualifying teams making it to the final round. The winning trio was the team featuring Tina, Rhux, and 1400pika.

League of Legends 
The 2019 Twitch Rivals event featured two competitions: the NA vs. EU Showmatch, and the Rumble On The Rift tournament. Both tournaments featured a first place cash prize of $20,000, and a second place consolation prize of $5,000.

NA vs. EU Showmatch 
This tournament featured two teams:

 Team NA
 WingsOfDeath
 nightblue3
 anniebot
 Yvonnie
 Natsumili
 Team EU
 GobGG
 ElOjoNinja
 NoWay4u_Sir
 CarritosKami
 DrFeelGood

Rumble on the Rift 
This tournament featured two teams:

 Team Tyler1
 Tyler1
 voyboy
 Nightblue3
 Shiphtur
 LilyPichu
 Team Yassuo
 Yassuo
 Boxbox
 trick2g
 xfsn_saber
 Pokimane

See also
 TwitchCon

References

External links
 

Twitch (service)
Esports tournaments
Recurring events established in 2019